Leda makeshift settlement is a refugee camp constructed for Rohingya refugees on government-owned land in Nhilla Union of the Teknaf sub-district in Cox's Bazar, Bangladesh.

History 
Since then the camp site has been managed by the International Organization for Migration. The camp is governed by a Camp Management Committee composed of camp residents.

As of 14 January 2018, the population of refugees living within the original area of the Leda makeshift camp is 15,300. Another 34,400 are living in the extended camp area.

Facilities 
A ten-bed clinic run by IOM provides facility-based delivery services as well as basic emergency obstetric and newborn care. Various NGOs operating the camp also provide madrassas, drinking water, latrines, washrooms, desludging tanks and child friendly spaces. Leda has shops run by Bengali locals as well as Rohingya refugees.

References 

Rohingya conflict
Refugee camps in Bangladesh